Joseph Osbertus Hamley  (25 September 1820 – 5 July 1911) was a British Army Officer who administered the New Zealand station of the British Army Military Store Department during the New Zealand Wars.
 
Hamley was second son of Joseph Hamley, coroner of Bodmin Cornwall and joined the Sydney, New South Wales Office of the Board of Ordnance in 1838. Taking up the position of Assistant Storekeeper of the Wellington Office of the Board of Ordnance in 1847, Hamley saw service in the Wanganui Campaign of 1847.  By 1859 the Military Store Department had replaced the Board of Ordnance, with Hamley in charge of the New Zealand station. Based at Fort Britomart in Auckland, Hamley supervised supervise the Departments operations over the course of the New Zealand Wars from 1860 to 1870.  Following the withdraw of Imperial Forces from New Zealand, except of the Imperial officer remaining to pay pensioners, Hamley was one of  the last remaining Imperial Officers in New Zealand.

Returning to England in 1870, Hamley was appointed in charge of Gun Wharf at Chatham, followed by postings to the War Office, Dover and Aldershot.  Hamley retired after fifty years of service (thirty-two overseas) with the honorary rank of Major General. Hamley died in London on 5 July 1911.

References 

1820 births
1911 deaths
British military personnel of the New Zealand Wars
19th-century British Army personnel
Companions of the Order of the Bath
People from Bodmin
British Army major generals
British Army Commissariat officers